ROCS Chung Cheng may refer to one of the following ships of the Republic of China Navy, all three named after President Chiang Kai-shek (formal name Chiang Chung-cheng):

 , the former American  USS Lafayette County (LST-859); acquired by the Republic of China Navy in 1958; fate unknown
 ROCS Chung Cheng (LSD-191) (1960), the former American  USS White Marsh (LSD-8); acquired by the Republic of China Navy in 1960; scrapped, 1985
 ROCS Chung Cheng (LSD-191) (1984), the former American  USS Comstock (LSD-19); acquired by the Republic of China Navy in October 1984 and sunk as an artificial reef in 2015

Republic of China Navy ship names